The St. Michael the Archangel Cathedral (also Orizaba Cathedral) is the main Catholic church of the city of Orizaba in the state of Veracruz and of the Diocese of Orizaba in Mexico.

It was established thanks to the Franciscans at the end of the seventeenth century in 1692, which marks their arrival in the city. It is located in the center of the city, and is considered one of the most beautiful in Mexico.

It is known for its details in Baroque and Neoclassical styles as well as the chapels annexed to the building, constructed in the eighteenth century.

See also
Roman Catholicism in Mexico
St. Michael the Archangel

References

Roman Catholic cathedrals in Mexico
Roman Catholic churches completed in 1720
18th-century Roman Catholic church buildings in Mexico